Manara is an unincorporated community in Marion Township, Fayette County, Ohio, United States.

History
Manara was laid out at the crossroads of two turnpikes. A post office called Manara was established in 1889, and remained in operation until 1902.

References 

Unincorporated communities in Fayette County, Ohio
Unincorporated communities in Ohio